Area codes 410, 443, and 667 are telephone area codes serving the eastern half of the U.S. state of Maryland, including the Baltimore metropolitan area and the Eastern Shore. The 410 area code is the original area code, while the 443 and 667 codes are overlay codes. 443 and 667 were primarily used with cellular phones and competitive local exchange carriers such as Comcast or Cavalier Telephone when introduced but have since become universal in their carrier availability.

History
Before these area codes were created, all of Maryland had been served by 301 since the institution of area codes in 1947, even though the state is home to two very large metropolitan areas—Baltimore and the Maryland suburbs of Washington, D.C. (area code 202). This made Maryland one of the most-populous states to be served by a single area code. However, by the late 1980s, 301 was on the verge of exhaustion due to the rapid growth of the Baltimore and Washington suburbs, as well as the proliferation of fax machines and pagers.

The number shortage problem was exacerbated by the use of 202 as a de facto overlay for the inner ring of the Washington metro area, even though it was split between three area codes–301, 202, and Northern Virginia's 703. This was accomplished via a system of central office code protection in which no central office code was duplicated in the region. Each existing central office code was properly routed with each area code in the region so that each telephone number in the region could be dialed with any of the regional area codes, giving the appearance of an overlay plan. One consequence of this was that a central office prefix could not be duplicated anywhere in the Washington area. Thus, if a 202-574 number was in use in the District or a 703-574 number was in use in northern Virginia, the corresponding 301-574 number could only be assigned to an area considered a safe distance from Washington, such as but not limited to in the Eastern Shore.

The partial overlay ended in 1990, but it soon became apparent that this would not free up enough numbers to meet demand. By the fall of 1990, it was apparent that Maryland needed another area code. In November 1990, a plan to add a second area code to the state was announced. It was decided that the Baltimore metropolitan area and the Eastern Shore would get the new area code, area code 410, while western and southern Maryland—including the Washington suburbs—would remain with the 301 area code. Bell Atlantic (now Verizon), the largest telephone provider in the region, allowed the western part of the state to retain 301 in order to keep the large number of federal agencies on the Maryland side of the Washington area from having to change their numbers. On the other side of the Potomac River, many of the same factors resulted in most of the old 703 territory outside of Northern Virginia split off as area code 540 in 1995. While Maryland would have needed a second area code at some point due to rapid growth in the Washington and Baltimore suburbs, it is very likely that the immediate need for another area code would have been staved off had it been possible to assign more 301 numbers to the Baltimore area before 1990.

Area code 410 officially entered service on October 6, 1991; it was initially implemented in permissive-dialing mode, not as a flash-cut, with the 10-digit dialing scheme coming in for local calls across the new 301/410 boundary.  The split largely followed metro lines.  However, slivers of Anne Arundel and Carroll counties, as well as much of western Howard County, stayed in 301 even though these counties reckoned as part of the Baltimore area. Conversely, slivers of Frederick County, a Washington exurb, switched to 410. Effective November 1, 1991, ten-digit dialing was required when calling a different area code in Maryland.

Although the split was intended to be a long-term solution, within five years 410 was already close to exhaustion due to the proliferation of cell phones and pagers, particularly in and around Baltimore. To solve this problem, area code 443 was overlaid onto the 410 territory on July 1, 1997.  Overlays were a new concept at the time, and had met resistance because of the requirement for ten-digit dialing. However, the alternative would have been a split that would have forced residents of either Baltimore or the Eastern Shore to change their numbers for the second time in a decade.

By 2011, the 410/443 area was once again running out of numbers because of the continued proliferation of cell phones.  To spare residents another number change to a new area code, a third overlay code, area code 667, was implemented on March 24, 2012. This had the effect of assigning 24 million numbers to just over four million people. Based on current projections, a fourth area code will not be required in the region until about 2030.

Coverage
The counties served by these area codes include:

In the Baltimore metropolitan area: 
 All of Baltimore City and Baltimore, Calvert and Harford counties
 Most of Anne Arundel, Carroll and Howard counties
 A small portion of eastern Frederick County

All of Maryland's Eastern Shore:
 Caroline County
 Cecil County
 Dorchester County
 Kent County
 Queen Anne's County
 Somerset County
 Talbot County
 Wicomico County
 Worcester County

Explanatory notes

References

External links 

 List of cities covered and exchanges from Area-Codes.com, 410 Area Code
 List of cities covered and exchanges from Area-Codes.com, 443 Area Code

410
410
Communications in Baltimore
Telecommunications-related introductions in 1991
Telecommunications-related introductions in 1997
Telecommunications-related introductions in 2012